Mary Jeanette Robison (19 April 1858 – 20 October 1942), known professionally as May Robson, was an Australian-born American-based actress whose career spanned 58 years, starting in 1883 when she was 25. A major stage actress of the late 19th and early 20th centuries, she is remembered for the dozens of films she appeared in during the 1930s, when she was in her 70s.

Robson was the earliest-born person, and the first Australian to be nominated for an Academy Award (for her leading role in Lady for a Day in 1933).

Early life

Mary Jeanette Robison was born 19 April 1858 at Moama, in the Colony of New South Wales, in what she described as "the Australian bush". She was the fourth child of Julia, née Schlesinger (or Schelesinger) and Henry Robison; her siblings were Williams, James and Adelaide.

Henry Robison was born in Penrith, Cumberland, England and lived in Liverpool. He served 24 years in the foreign trade of the British Merchant Navy as a mate and a sea captain. He retired at half-pay due to his poor health and travelled with Julia Robison to Melbourne, Victoria, Australia in 1853 on the SS Great Britain. By April 1855, he was a watchmaker, jeweller, silversmith and ornamental hairworker in Melbourne. According to Robson, her parents both suffered from phthisis pulmonalis, and moved to "the bush" for their health.  Henry bought a large brick mansion in Moama, New South Wales in August 1857 and opened the Prince of Wales Hotel. From there, he co-operated Robison & Stivens, coach proprietors for the Bendigo-Moama-Deniliquin service. The hotel was Robson's first home. Henry died in Moama Maiden's Punt on 27 January 1860.

On 19 November 1862, Julia married Walter Moore Miller, solicitor and mayor of Albury, New South Wales, at St Paul's Cathedral, Melbourne. Julia, Walter and the four children moved to Melbourne in 1866. Miller was a partner with De Courcy Ireland in the firm of Miller & Ireland in Melbourne in November 1867, and until 20 January 1870, when it was mutually dissolved.

In 1870, the family moved to London. Robson attended Sacred Heart Convent School at Highgate in north London and studied languages in Brussels. She went to Paris for her examinations in French. According to her obituary, she was also educated in Australia.

Marriages and children
Robson ran away from home to marry her first husband, 18 year-old Charles Leveson Gore, in London. They were married on 1 November 1875 at the parish church in Camden Town, London. They traveled on the steamer SS Vaderland and arrived in New York on 17 May 1877. They purchased 380 acres of land in Fort Worth, Texas where they built a house and established a cattle ranch. According to Jan Jones, "the Gores survived two years in their prairie manor house before homesickness, rural isolation, and repeated bouts of fever convinced them to sell and try their fortunes in the more settled East." They  moved to New York City with little money and Robson said that Gore died shortly thereafter.

Robson supported her children by crocheting hoods and embroidery, designing dinner cards, and teaching painting. By the time she began her acting career in 1883, two of her three children had died from illnesses, leaving only Edward Hyde Leveson Gore.

Six years after beginning her stage career, Robson married Augustus Homer Brown, a police surgeon, on 29 May 1889. They were together until his death on 1 April 1920. Robson's son, Edward Gore, was her business manager.

Career

On 17 September 1883, Robson became an actress in Hoop of Gold at the Brooklyn Grand Opera House stage. Her name was misspelled "Robson" in the billing, and she used it from that point forward "for good luck". Over the next several decades, she flourished on the stage as a comedian and character actress. Her success was due partly to her affiliation with powerful manager and producer Charles Frohman and the Theatrical Syndicate. She established her own touring theatrical company in 1911.

She appeared as herself in a cameo in the 1915 silent film How Molly Made Good; and starred in the 1916 silent film A Night Out, an adaptation of the play she co-wrote, The Three Lights.

In 1927, she went to Hollywood, where she began a successful film career as a senior woman. Among her starring roles was in The She-Wolf (1931) as a miserly millionaire businesswoman, based on real-life miser Hetty Green.

She also starred in the final segment of the anthology film If I Had a Million (1932) as a rest-home resident who gets a new lease on life when she receives a $1,000,000 check from a dying business tycoon.  She played the Queen of Hearts in Alice in Wonderland (1933), Countess Vronsky in Anna Karenina (1935), Aunt Elizabeth in Bringing Up Baby (1938), Aunt Polly in The Adventures of Tom Sawyer (1938), and a sharp-tongued Granny in A Star Is Born (1937). She was top-billed as late as 1940, starring in Granny Get Your Gun at 82. Her last film was 1942's Joan of Paris.

Academy Award nomination
In 1933, at age 75, Robson was nominated for an Academy Award for Best Actress for Lady for a Day, but lost to Katharine Hepburn. Both actresses appeared in the Hepburn-Grant classic Bringing Up Baby (1938).

Robson was the first Australian to be nominated for an acting Oscar, and, for many years, was also the oldest performer nominated .

Death
Robson died in 1942 at her Beverly Hills, California home at age 84. In its obituary, the Nevada State Journal said that she died of "a combination of ailments, aggravated by neuritis and advanced age." Her remains were cremated and buried at the Flushing Cemetery in Queens, New York, next to those of her second husband, Augustus Brown.

The New York Times called Robson the "dowager queen of the American screen and stage".

Works

Stage
The following is a partial list of her stage performances:

 Called Back (1884)
 An Appeal to the Muse (1885)
 Robert Elsmere (1889)
 The Charity Ball (1890)
 Nerves, adapted from Les Femmes Nerveuses (1891)
 Gloriana (1892)
 Lady Bountiful (1892)
 Americans Abroad (1893)
 The Family Circle (1893)
 The Poet and the Puppets (1893)
 Squirrel Inn (1893)
 No. 3A (1894)
 As You Like It (1894)
 Liberty Hall (1894)
 The Fatal Card (1895)
 The Importance of Being Earnest (1895)
 A Woman's Reason (1895)
 The First Born (1897)
 His Excellency, The Governor (1900)
 Are You a Mason? (1901)
 Dorothy Vernon of Haddon Hall (1904)
 Cousin Billy (1905–1907)
 The Rejuvenation of Aunt Mary (1907)
 The Three Lights (A Night Out)'' (1911)

Filmography

Silent

Sound

See also 

 List of Australian Academy Award winners and nominees
 List of oldest and youngest Academy Award winners and nominees

Notes

References

Further reading

External links

 
 
 

1858 births
1942 deaths
Australian film actresses
American silent film actresses
Australian silent film actresses
20th-century Australian actresses
Australian stage actresses
Actresses from Melbourne
Australian expatriate actresses in the United States
Burials at Flushing Cemetery
19th-century Australian women